Ismail Tiliwaldi (born November 1944) is a retired Chinese politician of Uyghur heritage. He was the chairman of the Xinjiang Uyghur Autonomous Region, the head of the Xinjiang government, from 2003 to 2007 ,and Vice-Chairman of the Standing Committee of the National People's Congress from 2008 to 2013.

Biography
A Uyghur, Tiliwaldi began working in 1967 and joined the Communist Party of China in May 1973. In 1967, Tiliwaldi graduated from Xinjiang University with a degree in mathematics.

During the Cultural Revolution, Tiliwaldi was sent to the countryside for "re-education". He then served as an interpreter at a local commune's tractor factory. In 1973, he found work in the Organization Department of Shufu County. He studied at the Central Party School in the early 1980s, ostensibly to prepare himself for higher office.

He served deputy chief and chief of the Organization Department for the Kashgar Prefecture, deputy Commissioner (equivalent to mayor) of Kashgar, deputy Party Secretary of Kashgar, Commissioner of Kashgar.

Beginning in 1993, Tiliwaldi served as the secretary-general for the Xinjiang Autonomous Regional Government, deputy Political Commissar of the Xinjiang Production and Construction Corps of the Army. In 1998, Tiliwaldi entered the Regional Party Standing Committee of Xinjiang and become and deputy secretary of the Xinjiang regional Political and Legal Affairs Commission.

In January 2003, he was elected as chairman of the Xinjiang region at the first session of the tenth Xinjiang People's Congress.

He was an alternate member of the 16th CPC Central Committee and a full member of the 17th Central Committee.

References

External links
Who's Who In China's Leadership - Ismail Tiliwaldi

1944 births
Living people
People's Republic of China politicians from Xinjiang
Uyghur politicians
People from Kashgar
Chinese Communist Party politicians from Xinjiang
Political office-holders in Xinjiang
Vice Chairpersons of the National People's Congress